The Moto Moto Museum is a museum in Mbala, Zambia, housing a collection of artifacts related to Zambian culture, first  collected by Canadian priest Jean Jacques Corbeil in the 1940s. The artifacts, collected for study and posterity by Father Cornbeil, were stored in the Mulilansolo Mission until 1964, when they were moved to Serenje, Zambia until 1969, then to Isoka. The current site, a former carpentry and bricklaying workshop, was donated by the Diocese of Mbala in 1972, to serve as a museum. When it opened in 1974, it was named the Moto Moto museum, after French Catholic Bishop Joseph Dupont, nicknamed Moto Moto (because he was often smoking his pipe and "moto" means "hot"), who began the White Fathers missionary in northern Zambia, where he worked from 1885 to 1911.

References

External links
Museums in Zambia
Moto Moto Museum

Museums in Zambia
Museums established in 1974
1974 establishments in Zambia
Buildings and structures in Northern Province, Zambia
Tourist attractions in Northern Province, Zambia